The Battle of Tecoac was a battle that was fought at Tecoac (municipality of Huamantla) in the Mexican state of Tlaxcala on November 16, 1876, between the forces of Sebastián Lerdo de Tejada, then President of Mexico, and those of Porfirio Díaz. The battle was a victory for Díaz, who subsequently assumed the presidency himself; Lerdo went into exile in New York City.

See also
Plan of Tuxtepec

Battles involving Mexico